Mapleton is a city in Bourbon County, Kansas, United States.  As of the 2020 census, the population of the city was 96.

History
Mapleton was originally called Eldora, and under the latter name was founded in 1857.  A post office was established under the name Mapleton in 1857. The first store in Mapleton opened in 1858. In 1861, the name of the town was officially changed to Mapleton, matching the name of the post office. Mapleton was so named for a grove of maple trees near the original town site.

Geography
Mapleton is located at  (38.013965, -94.882741).

Demographics

2010 census
As of the census of 2010, there were 84 people, 41 households, and 22 families residing in the city. The racial makeup of the city was 98.8% White and 1.2% Asian.

There were 41 households, of which 26.8% had children under the age of 18 living with them, 41.5% were married couples living together, 12.2% had a male householder with no wife present, and 46.3% were non-families. 43.9% of all households were made up of individuals, and 29.3% had someone living alone who was 65 years of age or older. The average household size was 2.05 and the average family size was 2.86.

The median age in the city was 45 years. 17.9% of residents were under the age of 18; 8.4% were between the ages of 18 and 24; 23.9% were from 25 to 44; 26.2% were from 45 to 64; and 23.8% were 65 years of age or older. The gender makeup of the city was 52.4% male and 47.6% female.

2000 census
As of the census of 2000, there were 98 people, 43 households, and 27 families residing in the city. The racial makeup of the city was 97.96% White, 1.02% Native American, and 1.02% from two or more races. Hispanic or Latino of any race were 1.02% of the population.

There were 43 households, out of which 27.9% had children under the age of 18 living with them, 46.5% were married couples living together, 18.6% had a female householder with no husband present, and 34.9% were non-families. 27.9% of all households were made up of individuals, and 16.3% had someone living alone who was 65 years of age or older. The average household size was 2.28 and the average family size was 2.71.

In the city, the population was spread out, with 22.4% under the age of 18, 7.1% from 18 to 24, 22.4% from 25 to 44, 29.6% from 45 to 64, and 18.4% who were 65 years of age or older. The median age was 44 years. For every 100 females, there were 96.0 males. For every 100 females age 18 and over, there were 85.4 males.

The median income for a household in the city was $23,750, and the median income for a family was $28,056. Males had a median income of $12,344 versus $14,375 for females. The per capita income for the city was $14,643. There were no families and 10.3% of the population living below the poverty line, including no under eighteens and 12.2% of those over 64.

Education
The community is served by Uniontown USD 235 public school district.

Notable people
 Fred Burke, a prohibition-era gangster, was born and raised on a farm near Mapleton.
 Charlotte O'Hara, former member of Kansas House of Representatives; raised in Mapleton.

References

Further reading

External links
 Mapleton - Directory of Public Officials
 Mapleton city map, KDOT

Cities in Kansas
Cities in Bourbon County, Kansas